Jonathan Ronald James Forte (born 25 July 1986) is a former professional footballer who played as a striker; he last played for League Two club Exeter City.

Born in Sheffield, he represented Barbados at international level. Forte's first professional contract came with his home town club Sheffield United before a move to Scunthorpe United in 2007. After four years, he then signed for Southampton in 2011. During his career Forte also spent time on loan at Doncaster Rovers, Rotherham United, Notts County, Preston North End and Crawley Town.

Club career

Youth career
Forte was born in Sheffield, South Yorkshire. He started his career at Rotherham United as a schoolboy in the Academy, but opted to join the Sheffield United Academy, along with Billy Sharp after Rotherham turned him away. During his youth career he made several appearances for England at youth level.

Sheffield United
Forte was mostly used as a substitute at Sheffield United, with only five of his appearances being from the start. He went on loan twice in the 2005–06 season, to Doncaster Rovers and Rotherham United. He scored eight times (four for each team) for these clubs, and played an important part in keeping Rotherham in League One.

In July 2006, Forte was re-signed by Doncaster Rovers, initially on a six-month loan deal. He helped Doncaster win the Football League Trophy on 1 April 2007 scoring the first goal in 3–2 (aet) victory against Bristol Rovers after only 43 seconds.
Over the course of his career at Sheffield United he made 30 appearances scoring one goal against Leicester City.

Scunthorpe United
Forte signed for Scunthorpe United on 4 July 2007.

He then signed for Notts County on 13 November 2008 in a very fruitful one-month loan deal. He scored four goals in four league games, including a hat trick on his debut against Barnet. He re-signed on a one-month loan deal at Meadow Lane in February 2009, getting himself on the scoresheet again with two goals against Bradford City in Notts' 3–1 home win. The loan was extended for a second month until 18 April in March. Forte scored two goals for Scunthorpe against Crystal Palace at Glanford Park.

Southampton
On 31 January 2011, he signed for Southampton for an undisclosed fee on a three and a half-year deal, joining up with former manager Nigel Adkins. However, he did not sign in time to feature the next day at Exeter City. He made his debut as a substitute in a 4–4 draw with Peterborough United. He scored his first goals from the bench against Milton Keynes Dons, with the score at 2–0 he scored two goals in two minutes, to bring it to 2–2. The game ended in a 3–2 victory. He scored his first goal of the 2011–12 season in a 4–1 win over Torquay United, in the league cup. He scored another in the League Cup, a 3–1 victory at Swindon Town.

On 8 November 2011, he signed for Preston North End, His loan expired on 10 December 2011. He made his debut against Rochdale in the Football League Trophy and he signed with fellow striker Sam Hoskins. On 27 January 2012, he signed for Notts County on loan until the end of the season. He scored a hat-trick against Charlton, the second of his career. The first had been at Notts County on loan in 2008 away at Barnet on his debut.

On 17 August 2012, Forte signed for Crawley Town on a three-month loan. He made his debut the following day, scoring Crawley's third goal in a 3–0 victory over his former club, Scunthorpe United.

On 31 January 2013, Forte returned to his first club Sheffield United, on loan for the rest of the season. Forte scored his first United goal in eight years when he netted in a 2–0 league victory over Bury at Gigg Lane. After initially starting regularly Forte was injured during the game against Bury, and struggled with his fitness during the rest of his loan spell. With United failing to gain promotion, Forte returned to Southampton having played twelve games and scored one goal.

On 17 May 2014, Southampton announced that Forte would be released.

Oldham Athletic
On 19 July 2014, Forte played as a trialist for Oldham Athletic against Melbourne City, playing for 75 minutes for the Lancashire-based-club. He also played in a 2–1 victory over Newcastle United. On 1 August 2014, Forte signed a one-year deal with the club, with an option of a further year.

Forte made his debut on the opening day of the season against Colchester United scoring both goals in a 2–2 draw.
Forte scored his 9th and 10th goal against Coventry this gave them an emphatic 4–1 victory and stretched Oldham's 12 game unbeaten run. In the next match a 2–1 victory over Bradford City Forte continued his goal scoring form with a goal in the 7th minute putting Latics ahead.

Notts County
After three previous loan spells at the club, Forte returned to League Two club Notts County on 1 July 2016 on undisclosed terms.

He was released by Notts County at the end of the 2017–18 season.

Exeter City
On 26 June 2018, Forte was signed by Exeter City.

In August 2019, Forte announced his retirement as a player, aged 33, due to a knee injury.

International career
Despite playing for England at youth level, on 26 March 2008, he made his international debut for Barbados in a 1–0 victory against Dominica. He qualifies for Barbados through his father. He turned down a call-up from the nation in November 2008 and has not played internationally since.

Career statistics

Club

International

Honours
Doncaster Rovers
Football League Trophy: 2006–07

Scunthorpe United
League One play-offs: 2008–09

References

External links
Jonathan Forte profile at the official Notts County F.C. website
Jonathan Forte profile at the official the Football Association website

1986 births
Living people
Footballers from Sheffield
People with acquired Barbadian citizenship
Barbadian footballers
Barbados international footballers
English footballers
England youth international footballers
English sportspeople of Barbadian descent
Association football wingers
Rotherham United F.C. players
Sheffield United F.C. players
Doncaster Rovers F.C. players
Scunthorpe United F.C. players
Notts County F.C. players
Southampton F.C. players
Preston North End F.C. players
Crawley Town F.C. players
Oldham Athletic A.F.C. players
Exeter City F.C. players
English Football League players
Black British sportspeople